Pattingham and Patshull is a civil parish in the district of South Staffordshire, Staffordshire, England.  It contains 48 listed buildings that are recorded in the National Heritage List for England.  Of these, two are listed at Grade I, the highest of the three grades, six are at Grade II*, the middle grade, and the others are at Grade II, the lowest grade.  The parish contains the villages of Pattingham and Burnhill Green and the surrounding area.  A large part of the parish is occupied by Patshull Park, the estate of Patshull Hall.  The hall is listed, together with associated structures and items in the park.  The other listed buildings include houses and cottages, farmhouses and farm buildings, churches and associated structures, including memorials in the churchyard, a public house, a former eel trap, a windmill converted into a house, and a memorial hall.


Key

Buildings

References

Citations

Sources

Lists of listed buildings in Staffordshire
South Staffordshire District